A New Conception is the third album by American saxophonist Sam Rivers, recorded in 1966 and released on the Blue Note label. The album features Rivers' interpretation of seven jazz standards.

Reception
The Allmusic review by Stephen Thomas Erlewine awarded the album 4 stars and stated "It's challenging music that remains accessible, since it reconfigures familiar items in new, intriguing ways. The sheer skill in Rivers' arrangements once again confirms his large, unfortunately underappreciated, talent".

Track listing
 "When I Fall in Love" (Heyman, Young) – 5:48
 "I'll Never Smile Again" (Lowe) – 5:57
 "Detour Ahead" (Lou Carter, Ellis, John Freigo) – 5:09
 "That's All" (Alan Brandt, Haymes) – 5:38
 "What a Diff'rence a Day Made" (Adams, Grever) – 6:18
 "Temptation" (Brown, Freed) – 7:38
 "Secret Love" (Fain, Webster) – 7:33

Personnel
Sam Rivers – tenor saxophone, soprano saxophone, flute
Hal Galper – piano
Herbie Lewis – bass
Steve Ellington – drums

References

Blue Note Records albums
Sam Rivers (jazz musician) albums
1967 albums
Albums recorded at Van Gelder Studio
Albums produced by Alfred Lion